The 17th British Independent Film Awards were held on 7 December 2014 in London. The awards honoured the best British independent films of 2014.

Awards

Best British Independent Film
Pride
'71
Calvary
Mr. Turner
The Imitation Game

Best Director
Yann Demange - '71
John Michael McDonagh - Calvary
Lenny Abrahamson - Frank
Matthew Warchus - Pride
Mike Leigh - Mr. Turner

Best Actress
Gugu Mbatha-Raw - Belle
Alicia Vikander - Testament of Youth
Cheng Pei-pei - Lilting
Keira Knightley - The Imitation Game
Sameena Jabeen Ahmed - Catch Me Daddy

Best Actor
Brendan Gleeson - Calvary
Asa Butterfield - X+Y
Benedict Cumberbatch - The Imitation Game
Jack O'Connell - '71
Timothy Spall - Mr. Turner

Best Supporting Actress
Imelda Staunton - Pride
Dorothy Atkinson - Mr. Turner
Maggie Gyllenhaal - Frank
Sally Hawkins - X+Y
Sienna Guillory - The Goob

Best Supporting Actor
Andrew Scott - Pride
Ben Schnetzer - Pride
Michael Fassbender - Frank
Rafe Spall - X+Y
Sean Harris - '71

Most Promising Newcomer
Sameena Jabeen Ahmed - Catch Me Daddy
Ben Schnetzer - Pride
Cara Delevingne - The Face of an Angel
Gugu Mbatha-Raw - Belle
Liam Walpole - The Goob

The Douglas Hickox Award
Given to a British director on their debut feature.
Iain Forsyth and Jane Pollard - 20,000 Days on Earth
Daniel Wolfe, Matthew Wolfe - Catch Me Daddy
Hong Khaou - Lilting
Morgan Matthews - X+Y
Yann Demange - '71

Best Screenplay
Jon Ronson, Peter Straughan - Frank
Graham Moore - The Imitation Game
Gregory Burke - '71
John Michael McDonagh - Calvary
Stephen Beresford - Pride

Best Achievement in Production
The Goob
'71
20,000 Days on Earth
Catch Me Daddy
Lilting

Best Technical Achievement
Stephen Rennicks - Frank (Music)
Chris Wyatt - '71 (Editing)
Dick Pope - Mr. Turner (Cinematography)
Robbie Ryan - Catch Me Daddy (Cinematography)
Tat Radcliffe - '71 (Cinematography)

Best Documentary
Next Goal Wins
20,000 Days on Earth
Night Will Fall
The Possibilities are Endless
Virunga

Best Foreign Independent Film
Boyhood
Blue Ruin
Fruitvale Station
Ida
The Babadook

The Raindance Award
Luna
Flim: The Movie...
Gregor
Keeping Rosy
The Beat Beneath My Feet

Best Short Film
The Kárman Line
Crocodile
Emotional Fusebox
Keeping up with the Joneses
Slap

The Variety Award
Benedict Cumberbatch

References

External links
 Website

British Independent Film Awards
2014 film awards
Independent Film Awards
2014 in London
December 2014 events in the United Kingdom